Calf most often refers to:

 Calf (animal), the young of domestic cattle.
 Calf (leg), in humans (and other primates), the back portion of the lower leg

Calf or calves may also refer to:

Biology and animal byproducts
Veal, meat from calves
Calfskin, leather 
Vellum, calf hide processed as a writing material
Calf-binding, a leather book binding

Geography
The Calf, a peak in the Yorkshire Dales, UK
Calf, an island off Newfoundland;  see Bull, Cow and Calf	
Calf, the product of Ice calving
Calves, Portugal, a hamlet in Póvoa de Varzim, Portugal

People
Anthony Calf

Other
CALF, the Common Affordable Lightweight Fighter project resulting in the Boeing X-32
Calf, short for calfdozer, a type of small bulldozer
Calf, part of an early type of internal combustion engine seen in the Ascot (1904 automobile)

See also

List of animal names, for animals whose young are called "calves"
Crus, the entire lower leg
Calve (disambiguation)
Calving (disambiguation)
Calf Island (disambiguation)
Golden calf, idol described in the Bible
Cow-calf, a set of switcher-type locomotives
Calf, a small island near a larger one;  see :Category:Calves (islands)	
Ilkley Moor, site of Cow and Calf Rocks